Bruno Battisti D'Amario (born 1937) is an Italian classical guitarist, teacher and composer.

D'Amario is known for his performances on film scores by Ennio Morricone and Nino Rota, and became Professor of Classical Guitar at the Santa Cecilia Conservatory in Rome. Morricone commented that D'Amario is "able to conjure up extraordinary sounds with his guitar" for his appearances on the soundtrack to the film The Good, The Bad and the Ugly. He was a member of the Gruppo di Improvvisazione Nuova Consonanza.

In 2011 he published a composition inspired by the Tarot cards.

References

External links

Italian classical guitarists
Living people
1937 births